A Blade in the Dark is a 1983 Italian giallo film directed by Lamberto Bava. Originally planned for television, the film was made as a nearly two hour piece split into four parts each of which would end with a murder scene. After the film was found to be too gruesome for Italian television censors, it was re-edited into a feature film.

Plot 
The film begins with three boys entering an old house, two pushing the third boy inside, where he's to take a dare. The pair gang up on him by throwing a tennis ball into the basement, saying he's a "girl" if he doesn't retrieve it and chanting he's a "female" when he hesitates. The boy slowly shuffles down in fear, and after some suspense, a scream is heard when he's out of sight. The ball is thrown back, stained with what looks like blood, causing the two other boys to flee out of their own terror. This is later revealed to be a film scene within the film itself.

Musician Bruno is hired to compose soundtrack for an upcoming horror film, renting the villa where the movie is set for a few weeks to help his inspiration. Property owner Tony Rendina, who's off to his father's rig in Kuwait, is delighted that Bruno accepts his request for some of his music, which Bruno promises to arrange for recording on a cassette. Giovanni lives in the basement as the groundskeeper, and Bruno's girlfriend Giulia is an actress off to another city for a stage play.

Director Sarah is trying to capture the fear of the dark in the film, reels of scenes revealing it's inspired by the circumstances of the opening scene. She refuses anyone seeing the ending to not spoil the production for its complete artistic effect. Bruno is told before Tony owned the property, a woman named Linda leased out the villa, but she's since disappeared after moving out and never been heard from again.

An unseen figure steals an extendable box cutter from Bruno's studio, finding a naked woman in a magazine image to leave cuts in for Bruno to find. Bruno meets Katia, one of the neighbors, who comes in unannounced and is scared by an arachnid in a cabinet. She doesn't tell him why she's there, but she flirts with him before leaving. Bruno finds Katia left her diary, which says she found out Linda's "secret".

Katia is attacked outside by the figure, chased into the basement, where she hides behind unfinished drywall. The attacker finds her and jams the box cutter through the mesh, eventually slashing Katia's stomach and throat, causing her bleed to death. When Bruno goes outside when he hears the killer drag Katia's body, the killer pulls out the blade ready to slash him too. Not noticing Katia right at his feet, Bruno heads back inside, where he finds blood on his pants and receives a silent phone call.

Bruno eventually goes over his music tapes, where he hears a woman's voice whispering "no one must know" the secret about Linda. The tapes are later destroyed, the diary pages thrown into the active fireplace. Giulia comes to surprise Bruno with a visit, supposedly in between rehearsals. When Bruno talks about his suspicions of Katia's murder, Giulia doesn't believe him and worries Bruno is cheating on her, causing their relationship to tense. When he later calls the theater company, the director revealed she couldn't keep attendance and was fired.

Katia's roommate Angela arrives, saying the two women were both models and Linda let then go swimming in her pool, which Bruno graciously welcomes as well. She can't answer many questions about Linda, who apparently returns, as a figure in heels, a sweater and skirt, and red nail polish watches Angela in the changing room. When she goes into the pool, Angela finds the utility blade sunk to the floor. When she goes back inside to wash her hair, Linda stabs her hand into the bathroom vanity counter, covering her head in plastic and beating her head on the counter edge. She then rips Angela's hand away and slashes her throat over the bathtub before cleaning the scene.

When Bruno sees the kitchen knife out of place and a hole in the vanity, he connects the dots, but he's still not believed. He goes into Linda's stored belongings in the basement with Sandra, where suitcases with her things included one filled with tennis balls. Sandra reveals Linda is the movie's primary inspiration. Giulia returns with a knife, as she's now scared because of the murders.

Sandra places a call to Linda, saying how sorry she is and that she embellished the ending specifically, but Linda quietly cries and hangs up. Linda is shown back at the villa from the view outside her window. She retaliates by finding the final scene at the studio and shredding it with scissors. When Giovanni discovers Katia and Angela dead inside a tank, Linda bludgeons him to death with his own wrench. When Sandra arrives to reconcile with Linda, carrying a knife for self-defense, Giovanni jumps out to grab her before he dies. Linda surprises Sandra by garroting her with film reel, laughing maniacally while dragging her corpse around.

Giulia arrives to find Sandra's body buried under film. Linda traps Giulia in the house by closing the garage door, taunting her with threats, messing with the lights, and dropping a ton of tennis balls from the ceiling. Giulia hides in a cabinet when she sees Linda, who finds her and wedges the knife in the closed door. When Bruno arrives, Giulia takes her chance to run, but Linda pierces her through her heart with the kitchen knife.

With Bruno happening upon the scene, Linda charges him, only for Bruno to knock her out with a brick. Bruno is then surprised when only a wig is where Linda was left. The killer jumps out, revealing himself as Tony all along. When Tony tries to stab him, Bruno rams the knife in Tony, who slowly dies while muttering "I'm not a female child" a few times. Bruno talks with a crew member, revealing Tony was too insecure and childlike inside to stave off Linda, his alter-ego, so he murdered other women out of rage and to prove he was a man. The final reel put back together reveals the boy in the basement, a young Tony, leaving with a skirt and a wig with pigtails.

Cast 
 Andrea Occhipinti as Bruno
 Michele Soavi as Tony Rendina/Linda
 Lara Lamberti as Giulia Rubini (as Lara Naszinski)
 Fabiola Toledo as Angela
 Anny Papa as Sandra
 Stanko Molnar as Giovanni
 Valeria Cavalli as Katia
 Giovanni Frezza as young boy in film clip
 Lamberto Bava (cameo in editing room)

Production
Lamberto Bava was offered to direct A Blade in the Dark while he was assisting Dario Argento on Tenebrae (1982). The film was written by the husband and wife writing team of Dardano Sacchetti and Elisa Briganti. Bava and Sacchetti recalled that their collaboration was difficult, with the two being more friendly during the production of A Bay of Blood (1971), but their approach to this film was at odds with each other.

The film was initially commissioned to be made for Italian television by producer Mino Loy and have been aired in four 30 minute segments. Bava explained that his initial goal was to have a shocking murder at the end of each segment. Producer Luciano Martino offered Bava his villa as a location for filming.

Release
When the film was presented to the television censors, it was found to be too gory to be aired. Rather than edit the film, the producers instructed Bava to cut the film into a theatrical feature.  This led to the 16mm print being blown up to 35mm for theatrical distribution. The film was released in Italy on August 6, 1983.

Troy Howarth in his book on giallo films described the English dubbing of the film as "some of the worst to be inflicted upon any giallo". The film was released three times on DVD in the United States. It was first released by Anchor Bay Entertainment in 2001. The company subsequently re-released it in 2003 on a double feature DVD with Lamberto Bava's Macabre. Both these versions are out of print. The third DVD release came from Blue Underground in 2007.

On Blu-ray, the film was released for the first time by 88 Films on August 23, 2015.

Critical reception 
AllMovie gave the film a mixed review, writing, "Lamberto Bava eschews complex mystery in favor of elaborate stalk-and-slash sequences, with only partial success".

References

Footnotes

Sources

External links 
 

Giallo films
1983 films
Films directed by Lamberto Bava
1983 horror films
Italian serial killer films
1980s Italian-language films
Films about composers
Films set in country houses
Italian horror films
Films scored by Guido & Maurizio De Angelis
Films produced by Luciano Martino
1980s Italian films